MV Rapana was one of nine Anglo Saxon Royal Dutch/Shell oil tankers converted to become a Merchant Aircraft Carrier (MAC ship).  The group is collectively known as the Rapana class.

Rapana was launched in March 1935 at Wilton-Fijenoord, Schiedam, Netherlands as an oil tanker and completed in April 1935. She was converted to a MAC ship by Smiths Dock, North Shields, completing in July 1943.

As a MAC ship, she had no aircraft hangar, and continued to carry normal cargoes, although operating under Royal Navy control. Only her air crew and the necessary maintenance staff were naval personnel. Amongst the aircraft that served on Rapana was Fairey Swordfish Mk II LS326. As of November 2010, it is airworthy with the Royal Navy Historic Flight.

After the war, MV Rapana was reconverted and returned to merchant service as an oil tanker and served in that role until scrapped in Osaka in 1958. She was renamed Rotula in 1950.

References

Oil tankers
Rapana-class merchant aircraft carriers
1935 ships
Ships built in Schiedam
Merchant ships of the Netherlands
World War II merchant ships of the Netherlands
World War II merchant ships of the United Kingdom
Merchant ships of the United Kingdom